Bauhaus Center Tel Aviv is an organization concerned with Bauhaus architecture and design in the city of Tel Aviv, Israel. Buildings designed in the International Style, commonly known as Bauhaus, comprise most of the center of Tel Aviv known as The White City. The vision behind the Center is to raise awareness of the Bauhaus heritage and be part of the cultural and artistic development in Tel Aviv.

History
The Bauhaus Center, founded by Asher Ben Shmuel, Micha Gross and Shlomit Gross in 2000, is at 77 Dizengoff Street in Tel Aviv, Israel. The founders recognized the need to document the history and patrimony of the Bauhaus architecture in Tel Aviv. They established the Center in order to increase awareness of this, and to expose Bauhaus as a style that crosses boundaries between different art media.

The Center has been collaborating closely with the Israel National Commission for UNESCO since the designation of Tel Aviv as a World Heritage Site in 2003. The Center also cooperates with the Municipality of Tel Aviv and several educational institutions, galleries, museums and associations of engineering and architecture.

The center was formerly located at both 99 and 155 Dizengoff St.

Structure
 Bookstore and Library - The Center's bookstore specializes in design, architecture and the city of Tel Aviv. Its library contains archival material about the Bauhaus era in the city as well as rare books about the subject. The Center also acts as an independent publishing house for books about Bauhaus architecture and design, and the City of Tel Aviv.
 Gallery - The gallery shows documentary exhibitions on Tel Aviv and its architecture, culture, people, design and photography.
 Tours - The Center conducts walking tours around the White City showing prominent Bauhaus buildings, built during the 1930s and 1940s. There are also self-service tours in the area of Dizengoff Square using an audio guide.
 Shop - The Bauhaus shop hosts a collection of items of a wide variety of purposes including fashion, interior design, Judaica and jewelry. It offers to local artists and designers a space to show, promote and sell their works to the public.

See also
Bauhaus Foundation Tel Aviv
Max-Liebling House
Architecture in Israel
Tourism in Israel
Culture of Israel

References

External links
 

Review of Bauhaus Center on Fodor's
 "Bauhaus Style, White City" (Review of the exhibition Between the Private and the Public Domains in Bauhaus and International Style in Tel Aviv held at the Bauhaus Center in August 2016), by Lotte Beilin, August 14 2016, Telavivian Magazine website  

Bauhaus
Art museums and galleries in Israel
2000 establishments in Israel
Arts organizations established in 2000
International Style (architecture)
Modernist architecture in Israel
Museums in Tel Aviv
Architecture museums
White City (Tel Aviv)
History of Tel Aviv
Cultural history of Israel